Whirl of Youth (German: Rutschbahn) is a 1928 British-German silent drama film directed by Richard Eichberg and starring Fee Malten, Heinrich George and Fred Louis Lerch.

The film's art direction was by Robert Herlth and Werner Schlichting.

Cast
 Fee Malten as Heli, Tochter aus erster Ehe  
 Heinrich George as Jig Hartford  
 Fred Louis Lerch as Boris Berischeff  
 Harry Hardt as Sten, der Gutsherr  
 Erna Morena as Blida, seine Frau  
 Arnold Hasenclever as Olaf, ihr Sohn aus 1. Ehe  
 S.Z. Sakall as Sam, ein Artist  
 Jutta Jol as Sonja, Helis Freundin  
 Grete Reinwald as Nadja Berischeff, Boris Schwester  
 Sig Arno
 Mona Maris

References

Bibliography
 Hans-Michael Bock and Tim Bergfelder. The Concise Cinegraph: An Encyclopedia of German Cinema. Berghahn Books.

External links

1928 films
Films of the Weimar Republic
Films directed by Richard Eichberg
German silent feature films
German drama films
British silent feature films
British drama films
1928 drama films
German black-and-white films
British black-and-white films
1920s British films
Silent drama films
1920s German films